Arizona Sunshine is a zombie survival first-person shooter video game released on December 6, 2016. The game is compatible with the HTC Vive, Oculus Rift, Oculus Quest, Valve Index and PlayStation VR virtual reality headsets.

Gameplay
Arizona Sunshine requires motion controllers for play. The controllers are used to manipulate virtual firearms as well as to interact with the player's inventory and the environment. The player can carry a firearm in each hand, as well as two more in holstered positions, one on either side of the hips. The game supports room scale tracking. In the original version of the game traveling long distances required teleporting by pointing the controller and pressing the appropriate button but a January 2017 update to the game made artificial locomotion (free-roaming) available as an option.

The game includes a campaign in which the player explores environments and finds the tools needed to advance, and a horde mode in which players are confined to a small camp and try to survive against increasingly difficult waves of zombie attacks. The zombies themselves spawn according to the player's chosen difficulty level. On higher levels, zombies can spawn in larger numbers, and tougher zombies with "armor" (e.g. Motorcycle helmets, army uniforms, etc.) spawn more frequently. Both the campaign and the horde mode can be played in single-player and multiplayer modes.

During the campaign the player constantly encounters small groups of zombies which are relatively easy to dispatch. But certain player actions, like picking up certain objects needed to advance the story, trigger a large zombie horde from which the player has to defend themselves by using their weapons and surroundings.

Plot
The unnamed player character (voiced by Sky Soleil), awakes in a cave in an Arizona river valley. While exploring his surroundings and killing zombies he encounters, he finds a radio, turns it on and hears, among much static, something which sounds like a human voice. Searching for the source of the signal, the player encounters another radio with a stronger signal and comes to the conclusion that it is sent from a refinery which has been reinforced by the military. But when he reaches the refinery, he sees that it has been overrun by zombies. The player kills them all in a fit of rage and then has a breakdown. After staying the night in a safe room in the refinery, he continues the next morning, aimless and desperate. But after finding another radio, he notices that the signal is still there and is being sent from a town called Sunshine, Arizona. The player continues to the town and finally reaches the radio station, only to find out that no one in the station is alive and the signal is sent automatically. But when he screams his frustrations into the radio station microphone, someone answers him and tells him to wait outside, where he is rescued by a helicopter after withstanding a massive horde of zombies.

Reception

Arizona Sunshine received positive reviews for the PC version of the game, while the PlayStation 4 version received mixed reviews. On Metacritic, the game holds scores of 81/100 for the PC version (based on 5 reviews) and 63/100 for the PlayStation 4 version (based on 31 reviews).

Core i7 exclusivity scandal
Shortly after the game's release, players discovered that certain unadvertised features in Arizona Sunshine were only available on systems with an Intel Core i7 CPU, due to a deal formed between Vertigo Games and Intel. PC Gamer referred to the hardware lockout as "unprecedented" in a video game. After fans expressed concerns, developer Vertigo Games announced that the restricted modes would become available to all players in March 2017. The lockout drew a large negative backlash from the player community, and Vertigo Games unlocked the features to all players a day after the lockout was discovered.

References

External links 
 
 

2016 video games
HTC Vive games
Oculus Rift games
Windows games
First-person adventure games
Video games about zombies
PlayStation 4 games
PlayStation VR games
Indie video games
Survival video games
Video games set in Arizona
Video games developed in the Netherlands
Meta Quest games